Fussballclub Chur 97 is a football team from Chur, Switzerland who play in 2. Liga Interregional (division 5).  

It was founded in 1997 as a merger of FC Chur, FC Neustadt and SC Grischuna. Predecessor club FC Chur played in the second highest league (National League B) from 1987 to 1993.

References

External links
  Official Website

Association football clubs established in 1997
Chur 97
1997 establishments in Switzerland
Chur